John Newell was a state legislator in North Carolina. He represented Bladen County, North Carolina. He served in the North Carolina House of Representatives from 1874 to 1875 and from 1879 to 1884.

See also
African-American officeholders during and following the Reconstruction era

References

Members of the North Carolina House of Representatives 
19th-century American politicians
Year of birth missing
Year of death missing